Farid Aslani (born July 4, 1988) is an Iranian professional basketball player.  He is 6' (183cm), plays as a Point guard. He has played for Iranian Basketball Clubs including Azad University Tehran, Mahram Tehran, Palayesh Naft Abadan, Petrochimi Bandar Imam, Zob Ahan Isfahan.
He also competed in the 2018 FIBA Asia Champions Cup http://www.fiba.basketball/asiachampionscup/2018, and his brilliance in these competitions made him more popular among the fans of the Iran Basketball League. He is especially popular among league fans in southern Iran due to his long and colorful presence in the Naft Abadan and Petrochimi.<ref>

References

Iranian men's basketball players
1988 births
Living people
Asian Games silver medalists for Iran
Asian Games medalists in basketball
Basketball players at the 2014 Asian Games
Point guards
Medalists at the 2014 Asian Games
Sportspeople from Tehran